Thomas Henry Morris (1896 – 5 January 1974) was a diver and wrestler who represent Australia at the 1928 Summer Olympics in both sports.

Morris was a member of the Melbourne Swimming Club, and in the 1919–20 season he won the clubs diving championship which was his first of 19 consecutive club titles, the following year he also won the Victoria state diving title which was his first of 10 titles in a row.

At the 1928 Summer Olympics in Amsterdam, Morris competed in three events, in the 3 metre springboard he finished eighth in his qualifying group which wasn't good enough to reach the final, it was the same outcome in the 10 metre platform event after finishing seventh in his qualifying group. At the same Games, Morris became the first Australian to compete in the wrestling events when he entered the welterweight contest, but unfortunately for Morris he lost all three of his bouts, which wasn't helped having a knee injury and uncertainty of the continental rules that were used in Olympic bouts.

In 1949. Morris became chairman of the newly formed Australian Gymnastics Union in preparation for the 1956 Summer Olympics which were held in Melbourne, at those Games Morris was a member of the management committee for the gymnastics arena.

References

External links
 

1896 births
1974 deaths
Olympic divers of Australia
Divers at the 1928 Summer Olympics
Australian male divers
Olympic wrestlers of Australia
Wrestlers at the 1928 Summer Olympics
Australian male sport wrestlers
19th-century Australian people
20th-century Australian people
People from Fitzroy, Victoria
Swimmers from Melbourne
Sportsmen from Victoria (Australia)